The League of Ireland U17 Division is the under-17 division of the League of Ireland. Like the Premier Division, the First Division and the National U19 League the National U17 League is currently sponsored by  SSE Airtricity and as a result it is also known as the SSE Airtricity National U17 League.
FAI High-Performance Director Ruud Dokter and then Republic of Ireland assistant manager Roy Keane officially launched the inaugural SSE Airtricity National U17 League at FAI headquarters in Abbotstown on July 27, 2015.

Teams

Northern Elite Division

Southern Elite Division

Kerry District League joins the Southern Elite Division as it has been awarded Under-17 National League licence for 2016 season.
Carlow-Kilkenny F.C. joins the Southern Elite Division as it has been awarded Under-17 National League licence for 2019 season.

U17 League of Ireland Champions

U17 Mark Farren Memorial Cup Champions

U17 Player of the Year

References 

Youth association football in the Republic of Ireland
Ireland
U17
Ireland
2015 establishments in Ireland
Sports leagues established in 2015